Maria Pasło-Wiśniewska (born 27 March 1959 in Szamotuły) is a Polish politician. She was elected to the Sejm on 25 September 2005, getting 7,062 votes in 39 Poznań district as a candidate from the Civic Platform (PO) list. In local elections 2006, she was candidate of PO for mayor of Poznań. She was defeated in her second run by her fellow graduate of the Adam Mickiewicz High School in Poznań and the current mayor—Ryszard Grobelny.

See also
Members of Polish Sejm 2005-2007

External links
Maria Pasło-Wiśniewska - parliamentary page - includes declarations of interest, voting record, and transcripts of speeches.

Members of the Polish Sejm 2005–2007
Women members of the Sejm of the Republic of Poland
Civic Platform politicians
1959 births
Living people
People from Szamotuły
21st-century Polish women politicians